Doug Peltz, popularly known as Mystery Doug, is an American science communicator and entrepreneur based in San Francisco. He is best known as the host of the weekly science show Mystery Doug, and as the co-founder and one of the voices behind the popular science curriculum Mystery Science, a science program used in 50% of U.S. elementary schools and recently acquired by Discovery Education. Mystery Science answers questions that viewers ask through activities and experiments.

Early Influence

Career
As an avid naturalist, Peltz was the first to discover that the Mediterranean red bug had migrated to North America.

Peltz has long appeared in various news outlets to explain and discuss natural phenomena, such as 2010 fireball over Irvine on NBC News and in the Orange County Register. In 2020, Peltz interviewed NASA astronaut Jessica Meir about what it's like living aboard the International Space Station and appeared on Wisconsin Public Radio to discuss how families were navigating the 2020 COVID-19 pandemic.

In 2013, Peltz co-founded Mystery Science with Keith Schacht. Mystery Science is an open-and-go standards-aligned curriculum with hands-on applications, phenomena-based instruction, and written assessments. Interviews with Y Combinator, one their investors, detailed an unconventional business model in which the company sold to schools and districts across the United States without a sales team.

In October 2017, Peltz launched an initiative titled Eclipse America in which he partnered with Google to provide free eclipse glasses and lessons to teachers in classrooms. Peltz's business endeavors have been featured by Forbes and the Wall Street Journal.

Peltz elaborates on his unique approach to answering children's questions in an interview with Montessori Education and on Game Changers TV.

In October 2020, Peltz joined Discovery Education as Mystery Science became a wholly owned subsidiary; Mystery Science was acquired for $140 million. The science program is now used in more than 50% of elementary schools.

References

External links 
 
 
 Mystery Science blog

Living people
Businesspeople from San Francisco
Science communicators
American YouTubers
Educational and science YouTubers
Year of birth missing (living people)